Pierre Zimmermann is the name of:
Pierre-Joseph-Guillaume Zimmermann (1785–1853), French pianist, composer and teacher
Pierre Zimmermann (bridge), Monegasque bridge player